The 1992 India–Pakistan floods was a deadly flood caused by a five days long heavy monsoon rains and severe weather that occurred on 7 September 1992 across the north-Pakistan of Azad Kashmir, North-West Frontier Province and Indian administered state of Jammu and Kashmir. Severe floods left at least 2,496 fatalities, including 2,000 deaths in Pakistan administered state, 296 in Punjab province, and 200 in northern India with several others missing. The floods swept away more than 12,672 villages and several people were buried alive due to landslides near mountains. Punjab, that shares its borders with Azad Kashmir, suffered a heavy agriculture loss in its economic history.

The floods evacuated 3.3 million people from the affected areas. Initial reports cited between 900 and 1,000 dead with 1,000 missing.

Background
The floods originated from the three major rivers such as Indus river, the longest river of the country, which flows through Pakistan, China and India, Chenab river, the  major river of India and Pakistan, and the Jhelum river, a river in northern India and eastern Pakistan. The heavy rainfall in northern mountains made three rivers overflow. The Jhelum river swept away more than 400 people in Punjab province, including refugees along with shelters built of mud on the banks of the river. Pakistan suffered a heavy loss of 2,000 fatalities as well as millions of worth properties, while hundreds of people died in Indian-controlled Jammu and Kashmir.

Emergency response
After floods struck Pakistan, mostly Azad Kashmir, the Government of Pakistan declared a nationwide emergency. The United Nations mobilized disaster management team to make necessary arrangements for dispatching disaster relief and to provide medical assistance to the flood victims of Pakistan. Pakistan also established the Prime Minister Relief Fund for 1992, a relief account designed to receive international funds as well as provincial-level relief contributions to combat the disaster. Government mobilized Pakistan army as well as local administration in an effort to recover missing people and to provide emergency services to the victims. The World Bank, a financial organization for government agencies, described the efforts of Pakistan "satisfactory" towards its swift recover of damage, although hundreds of people were confirmed dead.

Aftermath
Severe floods left 2,500 people dead, including 296 from Punjab.  More than 9.3 million people were affected, and 350,000 families rendered homeless, including refuge huts. A report by the Pakistani government stated that 12,672 villages in north Pakistan were washed away, 160,000 cattle drowned away, and 80% of bridges and roads were completely destroyed. It was declared a deadliest flood in the history of Pakistan, destroying an estimated $1 billion of property of that time.

See also 
 2014 India–Pakistan floods
 India–Pakistan border
 International response to the 2005 Kashmir earthquake
 2010 Pakistan floods

References 

Natural disasters in Pakistan
Weather events in Pakistan
1992 in Pakistan
1992 in India
Pakistan
Jammu and Kashmir
1992 disasters in Pakistan
1990s in Jammu and Kashmir
20th century in Azad Kashmir
20th century in Khyber Pakhtunkhwa
20th century in Punjab, Pakistan
Floods in India
Floods in Pakistan
Disasters in Jammu and Kashmir
India–Pakistan relations
September 1992 events in Asia
International responses to natural disasters